Viktor Postnikov (born January 14, 1992) is a Russian professional ice hockey defenceman

Postnikov made his Kontinental Hockey League debut playing with Avtomobilist Yekaterinburg during the 2013–14 KHL season.

References

External links

1992 births
Living people
Avtomobilist Yekaterinburg players
Metallurg Magnitogorsk players
Metallurg Novokuznetsk players
HK Poprad players
Russian ice hockey defencemen
People from Magnitogorsk
Sportspeople from Chelyabinsk Oblast
Russian expatriate sportspeople in the Czech Republic
Russian expatriate sportspeople in Slovakia
Expatriate ice hockey players in the Czech Republic
Expatriate ice hockey players in Slovakia
Russian expatriate ice hockey people